Dongcha is a town in Maiji District, Tianshui, China. It is located at the main eastern gateway to Gansu, 106 km east from the built-up area of Tianshui, and 64 km east of Baoji.

It governs 14 administrative villages and has a total population of 10,742.

The economy depends on  forestry, fruit and walnut orchards, animal husbandry,  and tourism.

See also
 Dongcha railway station

References 

Township-level divisions of Gansu